Sinplus is an alternative rock duo made up of brothers Ivan and Gabriel Broggini originally from Locarno, Switzerland.

Music career
Growing up in a music-addicted family, Ivan (guitar) and Gabriel (vocals) Broggini were musicians before they even knew it. They quickly realised their love for dirty bass lines, pounding rhythms and infectious melodies. As an independent duo, the Broggini brothers have claimed multiple awards and nominations, including an MTV award as Best Swiss Act, a nomination as Best European Act and representing  Switzerland in the Eurovision Song Contest in Baku, Azerbaijan with the song "Unbreakable".

When both the ballad “You and I”, featuring the Californian singer/songwriter Mickey Shiloh, as well as the soundtrack they were asked to write for the European Gymnastics Championship "Tieniti Forte" went gold in their home country, it was another sign that something special was happening. Sinplus also had the chance to tour all around Europe, from tiny bars to arenas and festivals such Isle Of Wight and Moon & Stars, and share stages with international acts such as Roxette.

While they developed, their music took in more pop sounds and experimentation, but they have always maintained the energy and attitude of rock and roll. After the release of their last album "This Is What We Are", Sinplus have started a new path of musical research on the traces of their roots.

2019 was intense and emotional, with many changes for them. They decided to return to California to breathe the West Coast rock vibe before spending time in Nashville with the Grammy-nominated producer J.T. Daly, experimenting with the sounds they were looking for.

This new wave has brought a brand new Sinplus sound. The two brothers have now created their own blend of alternative rock, guitar-hooks and break-beats with a fierce determination to be part of a rock n roll revolution. In 2020 they released ‘It’s Not About Being Good’, an EP that marked the beginning of the band’s new era, which was then followed by the highly anticipated new album ‘Break The Rules’: “This is the first album we've ever recorded that sounds exactly like what we wanted from the very beginning: Rock and Roll.”

Following the radio and streaming success of ‘Break The Rules’ (including major rock radio playlists all around Europe and multiple adds to Spotify editorial “All New Rock”), the band is releasing “Wildflower”, a new single that marks both a confirmation of Sinplus sound and the beginning of a new cycle. “Wildflower” is the first single of what is going to be a 2022 full of new releases and, yes, a new album.

Discography

Albums

Singles

Awards

References

External links 

Eurovision Song Contest entrants for Switzerland
Eurovision Song Contest entrants of 2012
People from Locarno District
Swiss rock music groups
Swiss musical duos
English-language singers from Switzerland